Nazim Huseynov (born 2 August 1969 in Baku, Azerbaijan SSR, Soviet Union), is an Azerbaijani judoka who won the Men's - 60 kg in the 1992 Summer Olympics, competing for the Unified Team.

Biography
In 1992 Nazim Huseynov became the first Azerbaijani judoka to win an Olympic gold. Prior to the 1992 Olympics Huseynov won bronze at the 1991 World Judo Championships and the European title at the 1992 European Judo Championships and established himself as one of the top extra-lightweight judokas in the world.

After the 1992 Olympics and the fall of Soviet Union Hüseynov continued to compete, now representing his native Azerbaijan. In 1993 he defended his European title and won silver medal at the 1993 World Championships held in Hamilton.

In 1994 Huseynov won silver at the European Championships, but fell off his form after that year and retired from sports in 2000, working as a judo coach.

Achievements

References

External links
 
 Videos of Nazim Huseynov Judovision.org

1969 births
Living people
Azerbaijani male judoka
Azerbaijani people of Lezgian descent
Judoka at the 1992 Summer Olympics
Olympic judoka of the Unified Team
Olympic gold medalists for the Unified Team
Judoka at the 1996 Summer Olympics
Olympic judoka of Azerbaijan
Olympic medalists in judo
Sportspeople from Baku
Medalists at the 1992 Summer Olympics
Soviet male judoka